Hydrophis cantoris, also known commonly as Cantor's narrow-headed sea snake and Cantor's small-headed sea snake, is a species of venomous sea snake in the family Elapidae.

Etymology
The specific name, cantoris, is in honor of Danish zoologist Theodore Edward Cantor.

Description
H.cantoris has the following diagnostic characters: Head small, body long and slender anteriorly; scales on thickest part of body juxtaposed; 5-6 maxillary teeth behind fangs; 23-25 (rarely 21) dorsal scale rows at neck, 41-48 at thickest part of body (increase from neck to midbody 18–24); ventrals divided by a longitudinal fissure; prefrontal in contact with third upper labial; ventrals 404–468.

Geographic range
Indian Ocean (Bangladesh, Pakistan, India, Myanmar (= Burma), Thailand, Malaysia), Andaman Islands.

Habitat

Reproduction
H. cantoris is viviparous.

References

Further reading
Boulenger GA (1890). The Fauna of British India, Including Ceylon and Burma. Reptilia and Batrachia. London: Secretary of State for India in Council. (Taylor and Francis, printers). xviii + 541 pp. (Hydrophis cantoris, p. 405).
Boulenger GA (1896). Catalogue of the Snakes in the British Museum (Natural History). Volume III., Containing the Colubridæ (Opisthoglyphæ and Proteroglyphæ) ... London: Trustees of the British Museum (Natural History). (Taylor and Francis, printers). xiv + 727 pp. + Plates I-XXV. (Hydrophis cantoris, p. 281 + Plate XIV).
Das I (1996). Biogeography of the Reptiles of South Asia. Malabar, Florida: Krieger Publishing Company. vii + 87 pp. + 16 plates. . (Microcephalophis cantoris, p. 61).
Günther A (1864). The Reptiles of British India. London: The Ray Society. (Taylor & Francis, printers). xxvii + 452 pp. + Plates I-XXVI. (Hydrophis cantoris, new species, p. 374 + Plate XXV, figure U).
Smith MA (1943). The Fauna of British India, Ceylon and Burma, Including the Whole of the Indo-Chinese Sub-region. Reptilia and Amphibia. Vol. III.—Serpentes. London: Secretary of State for India. (Taylor and Francis, printers). xii + 583 pp. (Microcephalophis cantoris, p. 475).
Wall F (1921). Ophidia Taprobanica or the Snakes of Ceylon. Colombo, Ceylon [Sri Lanka]: Colombo Museum. (H.R. Cottle, Government Printer). xxii + 581 pp. (Microcephalophis cantoris, new combination, pp. 330–334, figure 63).

cantoris
Reptiles described in 1864
Taxa named by Albert Günther